Zenaida doves commemorate Zénaïde Laetitia Julie Bonaparte
Andrew Smith begins publication of  Illustrations of the Zoology of South Africa (1838–50)
Antoine Laurent Apollinaire Fée publishes  Entretiens sur la zoologie. Oiseaux in the  Bibliothèque d'instruction populaire.
Death of Johann Gottlieb Fleischer
Death of Anselme Gaëtan Desmarest
Foundation of Royal Zoological Museum of Amsterdam
Foundation of Museo Civico di Storia Naturale di Milano
John Gould and his wife Elizabeth travel to Australia to work on  The Birds of Australia. They are accompanied by John Gilbert.
Death of Friedrich Wilhelm Ludwig Suckow
James Edward Alexander publishes Expedition of discovery into the interior of Africa : Through the Hitherto Undescribed Countries of the Great Namaquas, Boschmans, and Hill Damaras, Performed under the Auspices of Her Majesty's Government and the Royal Geographic Society. 2 vols. – London : Henry Colburn, 1838.  Waterhouse describes the  bird species collected and two new species, the short-toed rock thrush and the white-tailed shrike.
Thomas Campbell Eyton publishes A Monograph on the Anatidae, Or Duck Tribe

Ongoing events
William Jardine and Prideaux John Selby with the co-operation of James Ebenezer Bicheno Illustrations of ornithology various publishers (Four volumes) 1825 and [1836–43]. Although issued partly in connection with the volume of plates, under the same title (at the time of issue), text and plates were purchasable separately and the publishers ... express the hope, also voiced by the author in his preface to the present work, that the text will constitute an independent work of reference. Vol. I was issued originally in 1825 [by A. Constable, Edinburgh], with nomenclature according to Temminck

References

Birding and ornithology by year
1838 in science